Ameridae is a family of mites belonging to the order Oribatida.

Genera:
 Amerus Berlese, 1883 
 Andesamerus Hammer, 1962 
 Caenosamerus Higgins & Woolley, 1970 
 Cristamerus Hammer, 1977 
 Ctenamerus Balogh & Balogh, 1992 
 Haplamerus Balogh & Balogh, 1992 
 Hymenobelba Balogh, 1962 
 Neamerus Willmann, 1939 
 Petramerus Balogh, 1964

References

Acari